Salvia wardii is a perennial plant that is native to Tibet, found growing in alpine grasslands and thickets at   elevation. The upper leaf is slightly ridged with short hairs, the underside has red glandular hairs, especially dense on the veins.

The  corolla is blue with white on the lower lip, held in a purple tinged calyx, growing on terminal panicles or racemes.

Notes

External links
 Plants of Tibet

wardii
Flora of Tibet
Flora of China